Alexander Samuel Jeffs (July 8, 1871 – April 27, 1905) was an American football player and coach.  He served as head football coach at the University of Washington in 1899, compiling a record of 4–1–1. Born in King County, Washington, Jeffs graduated from the Portland Academy in 1894 and later attended and graduated from law from Stanford University in 1899.

Head coaching record

References

1871 births
1905 deaths
19th-century players of American football
Stanford Cardinal football players
Washington Huskies football coaches
Sportspeople from King County, Washington